Robert "Bob" Y. Wheeler (November 21, 1929April 15, 2017)) was a Democratic member of the Texas House of Representatives, representing the 69th District.

Biography
Wheeler was born November 21, 1929. He attended grade school in Tilden, Texas, and attended Texas Military Institute for high school.  Following high school, Wheeler served in the US Armed Forces during World War II.  

Wheeler earned a Bachelor of Arts degree from the University of Texas in 1950, and a law degree from University of Texas School of Law in 1954. Upon graduation, Wheeler ran for election in the Texas House of Representatives, and served three consecutive terms—from 1955 to 1961—as a Democrat representing the 69th District. Tilden chaired the Public Lands and Buildings committee, and was vice-chair of the Liquor Regulation committee. During his tenure, Wheeler also assisted with his father's ranching business in Tilden.

Wheeler enjoyed travel, and had visited each continent. He died in Tilden on April 15, 2017, and was buried at Hilltop Cemetery in Tilden.

References
 

Democratic Party members of the Texas House of Representatives
20th-century American politicians
People from McMullen County, Texas
University of Texas School of Law alumni
United States Army Air Forces personnel of World War II